Mechouar is a small urban municipality in the arrondissement of Al Fida, in the Al Fida - Mers Sultan district of Casablanca, of the Casablanca-Settat region of Morocco. As of 2004 it had 3365 inhabitants.

References

Subdivisions of Casablanca